was a Japanese scholar and writer of kanshi (poetry in Classical Chinese) and kanbun (prose in Classical Chinese), who lived in the Nara period of Japanese history.

Biography

Birth and ancestry 
Mifune was born in 722.

Political career 

Death 
He died in 785.

Literary career 
In 770 he composed the work , an account of the Chinese monk Jianzhen's work in Japan.

It has been theorized that he was the compiler of the oldest extant Japanese collection of kanshi, the Kaifūsō.>

Some of his poetry was included in the kanshi anthology Keikokushū.

Scholarship 
Mifune is credited with determining the canonical Chinese style posthumous names of early emperors who did not have them before his time (they only had Japanese style posthumous names). Between 762 and 764 he set the names of Emperor Jinmu, Emperor Suizei, Emperor Annei and so on.

References

External links 
Ōmi no Mifune on Kotobank.

722 births
785 deaths
8th century in Japan
8th-century Japanese poets
People of Nara-period Japan
Japanese nobility
Japanese male poets
Buddhism in the Nara period
Kanshi poets